The Shelburne Stars were a junior ice hockey team based in Shelburne, Ontario, Canada. They played in the Greater Metro Junior A Hockey League (GMHL). Established in 2010, the team was originally known as the Shelburne Red Wings.  They are also commonly known as the Shelburne HTI Stars due to a sponsorship agreement.

History
The Red Wings were formed in 2010 by Russian businessman Igor Vasilyev. The team was composed primarily of imported Russian hockey players. The Red Wings were the first junior hockey club in Shelburne since the Shelburne Wolves of the Metro Junior A Hockey League and Ontario Provincial League.

On September 11, 2010, the Red Wings played their first game, a road game in Thornhill versus the Toronto Canada Moose. The Red Wings were victorious, 5–4.

In December 2010, the Red Wings and the town of Shelburne became the centre of attention due to a pair of articles written by the Toronto Star's Robert Cribb. Cribb interview the players, townsfolk, and the player's parents in Russia to gain perspective on the team, the environment surrounding the team, the reaction of the town to the team, the reaction of Hockey Canada officials to the team, and also how the parents of the players in Russia felt. Readers of the Toronto Star, some local, some as far away as Chicago pledged money to pay off hockey-related debts for these players to continue their time with the Red Wings.

The Detroit Red Wings Alumni Association contacted the team to ask how they may help these players. The Mayor of Shelburne, Ed Crewson, held a town meeting to discuss Hockey Canada's policies, which he has labelled, "...severe and draconian."

In the autumn of 2011, the team decided to drop its exclusivity of Russian players, allowing players of all nationalities to participate in the Red Wings program.

In 2014, the team was sold and changed its name to the Shelburne HTI Stars. The team went on a one-year hiatus to reorganize and is scheduled to return to the GMHL for the 2015–16 season.

The Shelburne Sharks started operations under new ownership in 2015–16. The team's first Sharks captain was defenseman Storm Evans who played with the Red Wings in their last year of existence.

After the 2015–16 season, a new ownership was announced again and the team reverted to the Shelburne Stars. However, when the 2016–17 GMHL season schedule was released, the Stars were longer listed as an active team.

Season-by-season standings

League award winners
Marshall Uretsky Award (MVP)
 Alexander Nikulnikov (2010–11)
Bob Bernstein Award (Top Scorer)
 Stan Dzakhov (2010–11)
Al Donnan Award (Best Goaltender)
  Anton Kodykov (2012–13)

References

External links
Sharks Webpage
GMHL website

2010 establishments in Ontario
Ice hockey clubs established in 2010
Ice hockey teams in Ontario